is a Japanese manga series written and illustrated by Junji Ito. It was serialized in Nemuki from May to November 1996 and collected into one volume in May 1997. A live-action film adaptation, titled Love Ghost, was released in March 2001.

Media

Manga
Written and illustrated by Junji Ito, the series was serialized in Nemuki from May to November 1996. Asahi Sonorama collected the series' individual chapters into a tankōbon volume, which was released on May 20, 1997.

At Anime Expo Lite, Viz Media announced that they licensed the series for English publication. Viz Media released the volume on April 20, 2021.

Film
A live-action film adaptation, titled Love Ghost, was released in Japan on March 24, 2001. It was directed by Kazuki Shibuya and written by Naoyuki Tomomatsu. Eleven Arts licensed the film for international distribution.

Reception
Nick Smith from ICv2 praised the narrative of the first half of the story, though he also felt the second half did not fit with the first. Lynzee Loveridge from Anime News Network offered praise for the artwork, while also criticizing the characters as shallow.

The series was awarded the Eisner Award for Best U.S. Edition of International Material—Asia in 2022.

References

External links
 

Asahi Sonorama manga
Eisner Award winners
Horror anime and manga
Manga adapted into films
Science fiction anime and manga
Supernatural anime and manga
Shōjo manga
Viz Media manga